Mehmet Akif Ersoy Nature Park is a nature park located in Istanbul Province, Turkey.

Geography 
The park is situated in Bahçeköy neighborhood of Sarıyer district. The area was declared a nature park by the Ministry of Environment and Forest in 2011, and is one of nine nature parks inside Belgrad Forest. The protected area is named in honor of Mehmet Akif Ersoy (1873–1936), poet, writer, academic, member of parliament, and author of the Turkish National Anthem.

The nature park offers outdoor recreational activities, such as picnics, hiking and cycling.

Amenities 
The park offers an outdoor restaurant, an outdoor coffeehouse and playgrounds for children.

Ecosystem
The nature park has rich flora and fauna.

Flora 
The flora is middle-aged and old forest trees. In the forest section, vegetation includes oriental plane (Platanus orientalis), black pine (Pinus nigra), silver linden (Tilia argentea), hornbeam (Carpinus betulus), Hungarian oak (Quercus frainetto), sessile oak (Quercus petraea), common ash (Fraxinus excelsior), oriental beech (Fagus orientalis), alder (Alnus glutinosa), blackberry (Rubus) and tree heath (Erica arborea). Plants seen around the coffeehouse and the activity area are oriental thuja (Platycladus orientalis), blackthorn (Prunus spinosa), evergreen spindle (Euonymus japonicus), Chinese photinia (Photinia serratifolia), bay laurel (Laurus nobilis), Australian laurel (Pittosporum tobira), goat willow (Salix caprea), butcher's-broom (Ruscus aculeatus), wild privet, (Ligustrum vulgare),  common lavender (Lavandula angustifolia), purple dead-nettle (Lamium purpureum) and dandelion (Taraxacum officinale).

Fauna 
Common animals are the mammal squirrel and the reptile lizard. BIrds include woodpecker, European goldfinch, magpie and parrot.

See also
 Ayvat Bendi Nature Park
 Bentler Nature Park
 Falih Rıfkı Atay Nature Park
 Fatih Çeşmesi Nature Park
 Irmak Nature Park
 Kirazlıbent Nature Park
 Kömürcübent Nature Park
 Neşet Suyu Nature Park

References

Nature parks in Turkey
Protected areas established in 2011
2011 establishments in Turkey
Parks in Istanbul
Sarıyer
Belgrad Forest